Steve Richardson (born May 4, 1949) is a Canadian former professional ice hockey winger who played in the World Hockey Association (WHA). Richardson played parts of two WHA seasons with the Indianapolis Racers, Michigan Stags, and New England Whalers.

Career statistics

References

External links

1949 births
Baltimore Blades players
Baltimore Clippers players
Canadian ice hockey left wingers
Cape Codders players
Cincinnati Swords players
Greensboro Generals (SHL) players
Ice hockey people from Alberta
Indianapolis Racers players
Living people
Michigan Stags players
New England Whalers players
Red Deer Rustlers players
Syracuse Blazers players